The 2016 Open de Limoges was a professional tennis tournament played on indoor hard courts. It was the 10th edition of the tournament and part of the 2016 WTA 125K series, offering a total of $115,000 in prize money. It took place in Limoges, France, on 14–20 November 2016.

Singles main draw entrants

Seeds 

 1 Rankings as of 7 November 2016.

Other entrants 
The following player received a wildcard into the singles main draw:
  Alizé Cornet
  Fiona Ferro
  Caroline Garcia
  Amandine Hesse
  Alexandra Stevenson
  Dayana Yastremska

The following players received entry from the qualifying draw:
  Akgul Amanmuradova
  Alexandra Cadanțu
  Valentyna Ivakhnenko
  Galina Voskoboeva

The following player received entry as a lucky loser:
  Lina Gjorcheska

Doubles entrants

Seeds 

 1 Rankings as of 7 November 2016.

Other entrants 
The following pair received a wildcard into the doubles main draw:
  Amandine Hesse /  Tara Moore

Champions

Singles

 Ekaterina Alexandrova def.  Caroline Garcia, 6–4, 6–0

Doubles

 Elise Mertens /  Mandy Minella def.  Anna Smith /  Renata Voráčová, 6–4, 6–4

External links 
 Official website 

2016 WTA 125K series
2016 in French tennis
Open de Limoges